The European Union Bill 2004–2005 (Bill 45) was a bill of the United Kingdom Parliament which proposed to ratify the European Constitution and to incorporate it into the domestic law of the United Kingdom and to amend the European Communities Act 1972 to include it in the list of Treaties and hold a referendum throughout the United Kingdom and Gibraltar on whether to approve the proposed Constitution which would be overseen by the Electoral Commission.

The bill was first introduced during the parliamentary session of 2004/2005 and received a second reading. It fell at the end of that parliament. The bill was reintroduced in the new parliament and the 2005/2006 session, however it was withdrawn after its first reading by Jack Straw on 6 June 2005 following "no" votes in referendums that were held on ratifying the European Constitution in France and in the Netherlands. If the referendum had gone ahead it would have been the first UK-wide referendum to have been held since the 1975 European Communities membership referendum which at the time had been the only nationwide referendum to be held. No date for the proposed referendum was ever set however the expectation was at the time that it would have been held sometime in the first six months of 2006 with the possibility that it could have been held on the same day as the 2006 UK local elections which were scheduled and duly held on 4 May 2006.

House of Commons Library Research paper for the European Union Bill.

Proposed referendum question
The bill gave the question to appear on ballot papers:

and in Welsh:

permitting a simple YES/NO answer

See also
Treaty of Lisbon
European Union (Amendment) Act 2008
European Union Act 2011 
European Union Referendum Act 2015 
2016 United Kingdom European Union membership referendum

References

United Kingdom and the European Union
2005 in the European Union
Proposed laws of the United Kingdom
Referendums in the United Kingdom
2004 in British politics
2005 in British politics
2004 in British law
2005 in British law
Brexit